Forest Hills Country Club is a historic country club located in Wayne Township, Wayne County, Indiana. The clubhouse was built in 1927, and is a two-story, stuccoed, Tudor Revival style building. It has a cross-gable roof with half-timbering on the gable ends. William H. (Bill) Diddel designed a nine-hole golf course for the Forest Hills Country Club in 1927. In 1931, the club brought Diddel back to add another nine holes. Also on the property are the contributing swimming pool, two maintenance buildings, and two shelters.

It was added to the National Register of Historic Places in 2015.

References

Golf clubs and courses in Indiana
Clubhouses on the National Register of Historic Places in Indiana
Tudor Revival architecture in Indiana
Buildings and structures completed in 1927
Buildings and structures in Wayne County, Indiana
National Register of Historic Places in Wayne County, Indiana